Orlando Guy Figes is a British historian and writer. Until his retirement, he was Professor of History at Birkbeck College, University of London.

Figes is known for his works on Russian history, such as A People's Tragedy (1996), Natasha's Dance (2002), The Whisperers: Private Life in Stalin's Russia (2007), Crimea (2010) and Just Send Me Word (2012).   A People's Tragedy is a study of the Russian Revolution, and combines social and political history with biographical details in a historical narrative.   Figes has also constributed significantly on European history more broadly, notably with his book The Europeans (2019).

He serves on the editorial board of the journal Russian History, writes for the international press, broadcasts on television and radio, reviews for The New York Review of Books, and is a fellow of the Royal Society of Literature.

His books have been translated into over thirty languages

Personal life and education
Born in Islington, North London, Figes is the son of John George Figes and the feminist writer Eva Figes, whose Jewish family fled Nazi Germany in 1939. The author and editor Kate Figes was his elder sister. He attended William Ellis School in north London (1971–78) and studied History at Gonville and Caius College, Cambridge, graduating with a double-starred first in 1982. He completed his PhD at Trinity College, Cambridge.

Figes is married to human rights lawyer Stephanie Palmer, a senior lecturer in law at Cambridge University and barrister at Blackstone Chambers London. They have two daughters. He divides his time between his homes in London and Umbria in Italy.

In an interview with Andrew Marr in 1997, Figes described himself as "a Labour Party supporter and 'a bit of a Tony Blair man', though he confessed, when it came to the revolution, to being mildly pro-Menshevik."

On 13 February 2017, Figes announced on Twitter that he had become a German citizen "bec [sic] I don't want to be a Brexit Brit."

Career
Figes was a fellow and lecturer in history at Gonville and Caius College from 1984 to 1999. He then succeeded Richard J. Evans as professor of history at Birkbeck College, University of London. He announced his retirement in 2022.

Writing

Works on the Russian Revolution
Figes's first three books were on the Russian Revolution and the Civil War. Peasant Russia, Civil War (1989) was a detailed study of the peasantry in the Volga region during the Revolution and the Civil War (1917–21). Using village Soviet archives, Figes emphasised the autonomous nature of the agrarian revolution during 1917–18, showing how it developed according to traditional peasant notions of social justice independently of the Provisional Government, the Bolsheviks or other urban-based parties. He also demonstrated how the function of the rural Soviets was transformed in the course of the Civil War as they were taken over by younger and more literate peasants and migrant townsmen, many of them veterans of the First World War or Red Army soldiers, who became the rural bureaucrats of the emerging Bolshevik regime.

A People's Tragedy (1996) is a panoramic history of the Revolution from 1891 to the death of Vladimir Lenin in 1924. It combines social and political history and interweaves through the public narrative the personal stories of several representative figures, including Grigory Rasputin, the writer Maxim Gorky, Prince Georgy Lvov and General Alexei Brusilov, as well as unknown peasants and workers. Figes wrote that he had "tried to present the revolution not as a march of abstract social forces and ideologies but as a human event of complicated individual tragedies". Left-wing critics have represented Figes as a conservative because of his negative assessment of Lenin and his focus on the individual and "the random succession of chance events" rather than on the collective actions of the masses. Others have situated Figes among the so-called 'revisionist' historians of the Revolution who attempted to explain its political development in terms of social history. In 2008, The Times Literary Supplement listed A People's Tragedy as one of the "hundred most influential books since the war". In 2013 David Bowie named A People's Tragedy one of his 'top 100 books'.

Interpreting the Russian Revolution: The Language and Symbols of 1917 (1999), co-written with Boris Kolonitskii, analyses the political language, revolutionary songs, visual symbols and historical ideas that animated the revolutionary crowds of 1917.

Revolutionary Russia: 1891–1991, is a short introduction to the subject published as part of the relaunch of Pelican Books in the United Kingdom in 2014. In it Figes argues for the need to see the Russian Revolution in a longer time-frame than most historians have allowed. He states that his aim is 'to chart one hundred years of history as a single revolutionary cycle. In this telling the Revolution starts in the nineteenth century (and more specifically in 1891, when the public’s reaction to the famine crisis set it for the first time on a collision course with the autocracy) and ends with the collapse of the Soviet regime in 1991.'

Natasha's Dance and Russian cultural history
Published in 2002, Natasha's Dance is a broad cultural history of Russia from the building of St. Petersburg during the reign of Peter the Great in the early eighteenth century. Taking its title from a scene in Tolstoy's War and Peace, where the young countess Natasha Rostova intuitively dances a peasant dance, it explores the tensions between the European and folk elements of Russian culture, and examines how the myth of the "Russian soul" and the idea of "Russianness" itself have been expressed by Russian writers, artists, composers and philosophers.

Figes is credited as the historical consultant on the 2012 film Anna Karenina.

Figes has also written essays on various Russian cultural figures, including Leo Tolstoy, Dmitri Shostakovich, Sergei Prokofiev and Andrei Platonov. In 2003 he wrote and presented a TV feature documentary for the BBC, The Tsar's Last Picture Show, about the pioneering colour photographer in Tsarist Russia Sergei Prokudin-Gorsky.

The Whisperers: Private Life in Stalin's Russia

His book The Whisperers followed the approach of oral history. In partnership with the Memorial Society, a human rights non-profit, Figes gathered several hundred private family archives from homes across Russia and carried out more than a thousand interviews with survivors as well as perpetrators of the Stalinist repressions. Housed in the Memorial Society in Moscow, St Petersburg and Perm, many of these valuable research materials are available online.

Translated into more than twenty languages, The Whisperers was described by Andrey Kurkov as "one of the best literary monuments to the Soviet people" In it Figes underlined the importance of oral testimonies for the recovery of the history of repression in the former Soviet Union. While conceding that, "like all memory, the testimony given in an interview is unreliable", he said that oral testimony "can be cross-examined and tested against other evidence".

The Whisperers deals mainly with the impact of repression on the private life. It examines the influence of the Soviet regime and its campaigns of Terror on family relationships, emotions and beliefs, moral choices, issues of personal and social identity, and collective memory. According to Figes, 'the real power and lasting legacy of the Stalinist system were neither in structures of the state, nor in the cult of the leader, but, as the Russian historian Mikhail Gefter once remarked, "in the Stalinism that entered into all of us".'

The Whisperers includes a detailed study of the Soviet writer Konstantin Simonov, who became a leading figure in the Soviet Writers' Union and a propagandist in the "anti-cosmopolitan" campaign during Stalin's final years. Figes drew on the closed sections of Simonov's archive in the Russian State Archive of Literature and Art and on the archives of the poet's wife and son to produce his study of this major Soviet establishment figure.

Just Send Me Word
Published in 2012, Just Send Me Word is a true story based on 1,246 letters smuggled in and out of the Pechora labour camp between 1946 and 1955 between Lev Mishchenko (a prisoner) and Svetlana Ivanova (his girlfriend in Moscow). There are 647 letters from Lev to Svetlana, and 599 from her to him. They form part of a family archive discovered by the Memorial Society and delivered in three trunks to their Moscow offices in 2007. The letters are the largest known collection of private correspondence from the Gulag, according to Memorial.

Figes was given exclusive access to the letters and other parts of the archive, which is also based on interviews with the couple when they were in their nineties, and the archives of the labour camp itself. Figes raised the finance for the transcription of the letters, which are housed in the Memorial Society in Moscow and will become available to researchers in 2013. According to Figes, "Lev's letters are the only major real-time record of daily life in the Gulag that has ever come to light."

The book tells the story of Lev and Svetlana who met as students in the Physics Faculty of Moscow University in 1935. Separated by the Second World War in 1941, when Lev was enrolled in the Red Army, they made contact in 1946, when he wrote from Pechora. Figes uses the letters to explore conditions in the labour camp and to tell the love story, ending in 1955 with Lev's release and marriage to Svetlana.  The book documents five illegal trips made by Svetlana to visit Lev by smuggling herself into the labour camp.

The title of the book is taken from the poem "In Dream" by Anna Akhmatova, translated by D.M. Thomas: "Black and enduring separation/I share equally with you/Why weep? Give me your hand/Promise to appear in a dream again./You and I are like two mountains/And in this world we cannot meet./Just send me word/At midnight sometime through the stars."

Writing in the Financial Times, Simon Sebag Montefiore called Just Send Me Word "a unique contribution to Gulag scholarship as well as a study of the universal power of love". Several reviewers highlighted the book's literary qualities, pointing out that it 'reads like a novel'

Just Send Me Word has been translated into German, French, Italian, Spanish, Dutch, Polish, Swedish, Portuguese, Norwegian, Finnish, Danish, Japanese, Korean and Chinese.

Crimea
Crimea: The Last Crusade is a panoramic history of the Crimean War of 1853–56. Drawing extensively from Russian, French and Ottoman as well as British archives, it combines military, diplomatic, political and cultural history, examining how the war left a lasting mark on the national consciousness of Britain, France, Russia and Turkey. Figes sets the war in the context of the Eastern Question, the diplomatic and political problems caused by the decay of the Ottoman Empire. In particular, he emphasises the importance of the religious struggle between Russia as the defender of the Orthodox and France as the protector of the Catholics in the Ottoman Empire. He frames the war within a longer history of religious conflict between Christians and Muslims in the Balkans, southern Russia and the Caucasus that continues to this day. Figes stresses the religious motive of the Tsar Nicholas I in his bold decision to go to war, arguing that Nicholas was swayed by the ideas of the Pan-Slavs to invade Moldavia and Wallachia and encourage Slav revolts against the Ottomans, despite his earlier adherence to the Legitimist principles of the Holy Alliance. He also shows how France and Britain were drawn into the war by popular ideas of Russophobia that swept across Europe in the wake of the Revolutions of 1830 and 1848. As one reviewer wrote, Figes shows "how the cold war of the Soviet era froze over fundamental fault lines that had opened up in the 19th century."

The Europeans 
The Europeans: Three Lives and the Making of a Cosmopolitan Culture is a panoramic history of nineteenth-century European culture told through the biographies of Pauline Viardot, the opera singer, composer and salon hostess, her husband Louis Viardot, an art expert and theatre manager, and the Russian writer Ivan Turgenev, who had a long love affair with Pauline Viardot and lived with the couple in a ménage à trois for over twenty years. They lived at various times in Paris, Baden-Baden, London, Courtavenel and Bougival.

Figes argues that a pan-European culture formed through new technologies (especially the railways and lithographic printing), mass foreign travel, market forces, and the development of international copyright, enabling writers, artists and composers as well as their publishers to enter foreign markets through the growth of literary translations, touring companies and international publishing. In the continent as a whole, the arts thus became "a unifying force between nations" leading to the emergence of a modern European 'canon' so that, by 1900, "the same books were being read across the Continent, the same paintings reproduced, the same music played at home or heard in concert halls, and the same operas performed in all the major theatres of Europe".

The Europeans was published in the United Kingdom in September 2019. Writing in The Guardian, William Boyd described it as 'magisterial, beguiling, searching, a history of a continent in constant change'.  In The Sunday Telegraph Rupert Christiansen described it as 'timely, brilliant and hugely enjoyable - a magnificently humane book, written with supple grace but firmly underpinned by meticulous scholarship.'

The Story of Russia 
Figes published The Story of Russia in September 2022. A reviewer in The Spectator called it "a saga of multi-millennial identity politics"; Figes argues that no other country has so often changed its origin story, its "[h]istories continuously reconfigured and repurposed to suit its present needs and reimagine its future".

Views on Russian politics
Figes has been critical of the Vladimir Putin government, in particular alleging that Putin has attempted to rehabilitate Joseph Stalin and impose his own agenda on history-teaching in Russian schools and universities. He is involved in an international summer school for history teachers in Russian universities organised by the European University of St Petersburg.

On 4 December 2008, the St Petersburg offices of the Memorial Society were raided by the police. The entire electronic archive of Memorial in St Petersburg, including the materials collected with Figes for The Whisperers, was confiscated by the authorities. Figes condemned the police raid, accusing the Russian authorities of trying to rehabilitate the Stalinist regime. Figes organised an open protest letter to President Dmitry Medvedev and other Russian leaders, which was signed by several hundred leading academics from across the world. After several court hearings, the materials were finally returned to Memorial in May 2009.

Figes has also condemned the arrest by the FSB of historian Mikhail Suprun as part of a "Putinite campaign against freedom of historical research and expression".

In December 2013, Figes wrote a long piece in the US journal Foreign Affairs on the Euromaidan demonstrations in Kyiv suggesting that a referendum on Ukraine's foreign policy and the country's possible partition might be a preferable alternative to the possibility of civil war and military intervention by Russia.

Film and television work
Figes has contributed frequently to radio and television broadcasts in the United Kingdom and around the world. In 1999 he wrote a six-part educational TV series on the history of Communism under the title Red Chapters. Produced by Opus Television and broadcast in the UK, the 25-minute films featured turning-points in the history of Soviet Russia, China, and Cuba. In 2003 he wrote and presented a TV feature documentary for the BBC, The Tsar's Last Picture Show, about the pioneering colour photographer in Russia Sergei Prokudin-Gorsky. In 2007 he wrote and presented two 60-minute Archive Hour programmes on radio entitled Stalin's Silent People which used recordings from his oral history project with Memorial that formed the basis of his book The Whisperers. The programmes are available on Figes's website.

Figes was the historical consultant on the film Anna Karenina (2012), directed by Joe Wright, starring Keira Knightley and Jude Law with a screenplay by Tom Stoppard. He was also credited as the historical consultant on the 2016 BBC War & Peace television series directed by Tom Harper with a screenplay by Andrew Davies. Interviewed by the Sunday Telegraph, Figes defended the series against criticism that it was "too Jane Austen" and "too English".

Theatrical adaptations
Figes' The Whisperers was adapted and performed by Rupert Wickham as a one-man play, Stalin's Favourite. Based on Figes' portrayal of the writer Konstantin Simonov, the play was performed in London at the National Theatre in November 2011 and at the Unicorn Theatre in January 2012.

Amazon reviews affair
In 2010, Figes posted several pseudonymous reviews on the UK site of the online bookseller Amazon where he criticised books by two other British historians of Russia, Robert Service and Rachel Polonsky, whilst praising his books, among others. Initially denying responsibility for the reviews, he threatened legal action against those who suggested he was their author. Figes' lawyer later issued a statement that Figes' wife had written the reviews but in a further statement Figes admitted "full responsibility" for the reviews, agreeing to pay legal costs and damages to Polonsky and Service, who sued him for libel.

Prizes
 1997 – Wolfson History Prize A People's Tragedy: The Russian Revolution 1891–1924
 1997 – WH Smith Literary Award A People's Tragedy: The Russian Revolution 1891–1924
 1997 – NCR Book Award A People's Tragedy: The Russian Revolution 1891–1924
 1997 – Longman-History Today Book Prize A People's Tragedy: The Russian Revolution 1891–1924
 1997 – Los Angeles Times Book Prize A People's Tragedy: The Russian Revolution 1891–1924
 2009 – Przeglad Wschodni Award Natasha's Dance: A Cultural History of Russia.
 2021 – Antonio Delgado Prize (Spain), The Europeans: Three Lives and the Making of a Cosmopolitan Culture

Works
 Peasant Russia, Civil War: The Volga Countryside in Revolution, 1917–21, 1989, 
 A People's Tragedy: Russian Revolution 1891–1924, London: Jonathan Cape, 1996, 
 With Boris Kolonitskii: Interpreting the Russian Revolution: The Language and Symbols of 1917, 1999, 
 Natasha's Dance: A Cultural History of Russia, 2002, 
 The Whisperers: Private Life in Stalin's Russia, 2007, 
 Crimea: The Last Crusade, Allen Lane, 2010. 
 Just Send Me Word: A True Story of Love and Survival in the Gulag, Metropolitan Books, 2012. 
 Revolutionary Russia, 1891–1991, Metropolitan Books, 2014, 
 Revolutionary Russia, 1891–1991, Pelican Books, 2014, 
 The Europeans: Three Lives and the Making of a Cosmopolitan Culture, New York: Henry Holt and Co. 2019, 
 The Story of Russia, Bloomsbury Publishing, 2022,

References

Sources

External links

 Figes's free educational website on the Russian Revolution and Soviet history, May 2014
 Figes's website with oral history materials, September 2007
 new Figes website, September 2011
 
 BBC Four presenter interview, May 2003
 PBS filmed interviews with Figes 
 Video presentation by Figes of Just Send Me Word, 2012
 Figes on 20 years since the fall of Communism, 2011
 Stalin's children, The Economist, October 2007
 Sunday Book Review, New York Times, November 2007
 NPR Interview, December 2007
 The Destruction of Memory, Washington Post, February 2008
 Podcast of Figes speaking at the Samuel Johnson short-listed author event about "Whisperers", London (2008) BookBuffet.com
 Podcast of Figes 'On the Politics of Russian History', April 2009
 Figes author page and article archive from The New York Review of Books

English people of German-Jewish descent
People from Islington (district)
People educated at William Ellis School
Academics of Birkbeck, University of London
Alumni of Gonville and Caius College, Cambridge
Alumni of Trinity College, Cambridge
Historians of communism
British historians
Fellows of the Royal Society of Literature
Fellows of Trinity College, Cambridge
Historians of Russia
Naturalized citizens of Germany
Living people
Year of birth missing (living people)